HK Golfer Magazine was a monthly golf and lifestyle magazine, published in Hong Kong.

Endorsed as the “Official Publication of the Hong Kong Golf Association”,

References

2002 establishments in Hong Kong
Magazines published in Hong Kong
Golf magazines
Lifestyle magazines
Magazines established in 2002
Monthly magazines